Paula Anne Vennells,  (born 1959), is a British businesswoman and Anglican priest. She was chief executive officer of Post Office Limited from 2012 to 2019. Under her leadership, the Post Office prosecuted hundreds of subpostmasters for fraud, despite knowing that the relevant financial discrepancies actually arose from computer errors for which the Post Office was responsible. According to Channel 4 and the BBC, this matter is the biggest miscarriage of justice in British history.

In 2019 she became chair of the Imperial College Healthcare NHS Trust in London but in December 2020 left this role early. In April 2021, following the quashing of 39 of the sub-postmasters’ convictions, she resignedunder pressurefrom her duties as an Anglican priest, and from directorships at retailer Dunelm and at supermarket chain Morrisons.

Early life and education
Vennells was born in 1959, and grew up in Denton, Lancashire. Having won a funded place, she was educated at the Manchester High School for Girls, an all-girls private school in Manchester. She then studied Russian and French at the University of Bradford, graduating in 1981 with a Bachelor of Arts (BA) degree.

Career
Vennells began her career as a graduate trainee at Unilever in 1981. She went on to work for L'Oréal, Dixons Retail, Argos, and Whitbread.

In 2007, she joined the Post Office as group network director. On 1 April 2012, she became its chief executive officer (CEO). During her time as CEO, the Post Office went from losing £120 million a year to making a profit.

In February 2019, it was announced that she would step down from her Post Office role (she was eventually succeeded by Nick Read) and in April that year took over as chair of Imperial College Healthcare NHS Trust, which runs St Mary's, Hammersmith, Queen Charlotte's, Charing Cross and the Western Eye Hospital in north-west London. She also became a non-executive board member of the Cabinet Office.

From 2002 to 2005, Vennells trained for Holy Orders on the St Albans and Oxford Ministry Course. She was ordained in the Church of England as a deacon in 2005 and as a priest in 2006. She has served as a non-stipendiary minister at Church of St Owen, Bromham in the Diocese of St Albans. She was reported to have 'stepped back' from duties in 2021. She also resigned from the Church of England Ethical Investment Advisory Group.

Post Office scandal

In December 2019, the Post Office paid out £58 million to sub-postmasters who were awarded compensation for past false prosecutions of monetary theft that had been based on faulty evidence from the Horizon IT system. The judge presiding on the case, Mr Justice Fraser, described the Post Office's approach to the case as "institutional obstinacy" that

Vennells subsequently apologised to workers affected by the scandal, saying:

In January 2020, as the High Court case against the Post Office ended, Vennells's tenure as CEO was strongly criticised by Conservative peer Lord Arbuthnot, who said: "The hallmark of Paula Vennells' time as CEO was that she was willing to accept appalling advice from people in her management and legal teams. The consequences of this were far-reaching for the Post Office and devastating for the subpostmasters. However, there seem to have been no consequences for her." He described the behaviour of the Post Office under her leadership as "both cruel and incompetent", and said that "she was faced with a moral choice and she took the wrong one, the one which allowed hundreds of subpostmasters to be falsely accused, humiliated and ruined by the organisation she ran".

In early March 2020, she resigned from her Cabinet Office position.

On 19 March 2020, Vennells was harshly criticised in the House of Commons, particularly by Kevan Jones, MP for North Durham, who said:

In a BBC Panorama programme screened on 8 June 2020, reporter Nick Wallis is seen phoning Vennells, who terminates the call rather than answer his questions.  Wallis says "this is one of the biggest frustrations of covering this story ... the consistent refusal of the chief executive and the people at the top to answer serious questions about what has been happening". Vennells had been due to appear before a parliamentary select committee to answer questions about the scandal on 24 March 2020, but this was cancelled due to the coronavirus crisis and MPs' questions were dealt with in writing.

In June 2020 the Criminal Cases Review Commission sent 47 cases in which subpostmasters had been prosecuted to the Court of Appeal as potential miscarriages of justice. The Post Office announced that it was not contesting 44 of them. The cases have been described as the "biggest miscarriage of justice in modern English legal history". On 22 March 2021 a further 42 former subpostmasters had their cases of wrongful prosecution heard in the Court of Appeal, and are also seeking information about the UK government's involvement through the Parliamentary Ombudsman. They are also calling for the government to pay for their £46 million legal bill for their earlier successful court case. During the case, the Post Office's behaviour under Vennells' leadership was described as an instance of "appalling and shameful behaviour".

On 14 June 2020 Vennells's handling of the Post Office scandal and the relationship with her role as a priest were highlighted by the BBC's Sunday morning religious radio programme. A convicted former postmaster called for the Bishop of St Albans to strip Vennells of office, Labour MP Chi Onwurah said she must be held accountable, and journalist Nick Wallis reported "real anger" that Vennells appeared to have been protected by "the establishment" including the Church of England, which many see as immoral. The church refused to take part but a statement from the Bishop said that he would consider acting if he received conclusive evidence of her wrongdoing. As of 28 April 2021, Vennells is no longer listed as a member of the Church of England's Ethical Investment Advisory Group on which she had previously served.

The Care Quality Commission discussed concerns about her continuing role in the NHS on 8 July 2020. In October, the Imperial College Healthcare NHS Trust announced that it would seek external legal advice in reviewing the process that led to her appointment.  On 3 December 2020 it was announced that Vennells would step down as chair in April 2021, for personal reasons. On the same day, The Daily Telegraph reported that judges had refused to release a "smoking gun" document, being legal advice given to the Post Office in 2013, that could establish whether it had known for years that its prosecutions of the postmasters had been based upon false evidence. The former NHS consultant psychiatrist Minh Alexander, who made the original referral to the CQC, said that "the trust reluctantly agreed to commission an external report on her fitness only at a late stage", and speculated that Vennells had subsequently been pressured to resign. Arbuthnot said that emergence of this new evidence suggests that Vennells may be in contempt of Parliament for her responses given at the 2015 inquiry, commenting after her resignation: "Can it be a coincidence that shortly after it became clear that the Post Office lied to Parliament, Paula Vennells announced she was stepping down from the NHS job?"

In April 2021, thirty-nine of the convicted former postmasters had their convictions quashed, with a further twenty two cases still being investigated by the Criminal Cases Review Commission. Earlier in December 2020, the convictions of six other former postmasters were overturned due to wrongful conviction. The executive chairman of the legal firm representing many of the postmasters, Dr Neil Hudgell, said "now Post Office officials must face criminal investigation for maliciously ruining lives by prosecuting innocent people in pursuit of profits", and called for the prime minister to convene a judge-led inquiry.

A few days after the subpostmasters’ convictions were quashed, Vennells finally agreed to step back from her duties as a minister. The Bishop of St Albans said that it was "right" that Vennells did so. She also apologised, saying "I am truly sorry for the suffering caused to the 39 subpostmasters as a result of their convictions which were overturned last week". On the same day, she resigned her non-executive directorships at UK supermarket chain Morrisons and furnishings group Dunelm. Sky News quoted a boardroom colleague as saying "there was no way for her to stay on after the ruling – and it's hard to see how she will ever be able to work again". She also resigned as a governor of Bedford School.

On 18 May 2021, the government announced that it would put the inquiry into the Post Office scandal onto a statutory footing, enabling it to compel witnesses such as Vennells to testify, and to demand access to all relevant documents.

On 22 July 2021, the government said that it would make an interim payment of up to £100,000 in compensation to each of the postmasters affected in the scandal.

Honours
In the 2019 New Year Honours, she was appointed a Commander of the Order of the British Empire (CBE) "for services to the Post Office and to charity". In the aftermath of the Post Office scandal, the Communication Workers' Union has called for Vennells to be stripped of her CBE.

References

1959 births
Living people
20th-century British businesspeople
20th-century British businesswomen
21st-century British businesspeople
British chief executives
British women chief executives
Commanders of the Order of the British Empire
Church of England priests
21st-century English Anglican priests
People from Denton, Greater Manchester
Alumni of the University of Bradford
People educated at Manchester High School for Girls
21st-century British businesswomen